Each winner of the 1993 Governor General's Awards for Literary Merit received $10,000 and a medal from the Governor General of Canada.  The winners were selected by a panel of judges administered by the Canada Council for the Arts.

English Language

Fiction

Winner:
Carol Shields, The Stone Diaries

Other Finalists:
Caroline Adderson, Bad Imaginings 
Thomas King, Green Grass, Running Water 
David Adams Richards, For Those Who Hunt the Wounded Down 
Carol Windley, Visible Light

Poetry
Winner:
Don Coles, Forests of the Medieval World

Other Finalists:
Claire Harris, Drawing Down a Daughter 
Monty Reid, Crawlspace: New and Selected Poems 
Douglas Burnet Smith, Voices from a Farther Room 
Patricia Young, More Watery Still

Drama
Winner:
Guillermo Verdecchia, Fronteras Americanas

Other Finalists:
Daniel MacIvor, House Humans 
Raymond Storey, The Saints and Apostles 
David Young, Glenn

Non-Fiction
Winner:
Karen Connelly, Touch the Dragon

Other Finalists:
Marq de Villiers, The Heartbreak Grape: A Journey in Search of the Perfect Pinot Noir   	
Marian Fowler, In a Gilded Cage 
Jane Jacobs, Systems of Survival	
Noël Mostert, Frontiers

Children's Literature – Text
Winner:
Tim Wynne-Jones, Some of the Kinder Planets

Other Finalists:
Mitzi Dale, Bryna Means Courage 
James Archibald Houston, Drifting Snow: An Arctic Search 
Carol Matas, Daniel's Story 
Shirley Sterling, My Name Is Seepeetza

Children's Literature – Illustration
Winner:
Mireille Levert, Sleep Tight, Mrs. Ming

Other Finalists:
Scott Cameron, Beethoven Lives Upstairs 
Marc Mongeau, There Were Monkeys in My Kitchen! 
Russ Willms, Brewster Rooster 
Leo Yerxa, Last Leaf First Snowflake to Fall

Translation (from French to English)
Winner:
D. G. Jones, Categorics One, Two and Three

Other Finalists:
Jane Brierley, The Maerlande Chronicles 
Sheila Fischman, Following the Summer 
Linda Gaboriau, The Eye Is an Eagle 
Käthe Roth, The Last Cod Fish

French Language

Fiction

Winner:
Nancy Huston, Cantique des plaines

Other Finalists:
Esther Croft, Au commencement était le froid 
Robert Lalonde, Sept lacs plus au nord 
Rober Racine, Le Mal de Vienne 
Pierre Yergeau, Tu attends la neige, Léonard?

Poetry
Winner:
Denise Desautels, Le Saut de l'ange

Other Finalists:
Denise Boucher, Grandeur nature 
Roger Des Roches, La Réalité 
Madeleine Gagnon, La Terre est remplie de langage 
Serge Patrice Thibodeau, Le Cycle de Prague

Drama
Winner:
Daniel Danis, Celle-là

Other Finalists:
Jasmine Dubé, Petit Monstre 
Gilbert Dupuis, Kushapatshikan

Non-Fiction
Winner:
François Paré, Les Littératures de l'exiguïté

Other Finalists:
Léon Dion, Québec 1945–2000 : Les intellectuels et le temps de Duplessis  
Maurice Lemire, Formation de l'imaginaire littéraire au Québec 1764–1867  
Jean Terrasse, De Mentor à Orphée 
Andrée Yanacopoulo, Hans Selye ou la Cathédrale du stress

Children's Literature – Text
Winner:
Michèle Marineau, La Route de Chlifa

Other Finalists:
Yves Beauchemin, Antoine et Alfred 
Dominique Demers, Les grands sapins ne meurent pas 
Raymond Plante, Les Dents de la poule

Children's Literature – Illustration
Winner:
Stéphane Jorisch, Le Monde selon Jean de ...

Other Finalists:
Francis Back, Des crayons qui trichent 
Michel Bisson, Thomas et la nuit 
Sheldon Cohen, Le Plus Long Circuit 
François Vaillancourt, Le Premier Voyage de  Monsieur Patapoum

Translation (from English to French)
Winner:
Marie José Thériault, L'Oeuvre du Gallois

Other Finalists:
Hervé Juste, Histoire de la sécurité sociale au Canada
Charlotte Melançon, Grandeur et misère de la modernité

Governor General's Awards
Governor General's Awards
Governor General's Awards